Filabad (also Romanized as Fīlābād) is a city (based on new Definitions and Rules of State Divisions published in February 2019) located in Babaheydar District of Farsan County, Chaharmahal and Bakhtiari province, Iran. Until February 2019, Filbad was first a village in Mizdej-e Olya Rural District of the Central District, and then of Sarab-e Sofla Rural District of the newly formed Babaheydar District. On February 28, 2019, with the approval of the Government of the Republic, it was elevated to the status of a city in the new Definitions and Rules of State Divisions.

At the 2006 census, its population was 4,713 in 1,032 households. The following census in 2011 counted 5,224 people in 1,408 households. The latest census in 2016 showed a population of 4,656 people in 1,401 households. The city is populated by Lurs.

References 

Farsan County

Cities in Chaharmahal and Bakhtiari Province

Populated places in Chaharmahal and Bakhtiari Province

Populated places in Farsan County

Luri settlements in Chaharmahal and Bakhtiari Province